First Lieutenant  (born ) is the first female fighter pilot in Japan. 

Matsushima graduated from the Japan National Defense Academy in March 2014 and obtained her pilot's license in October 2016. Matsushima initially trained to be a transport and rescue pilot, but started training to be a fighter pilot after the Ministry of Defense opened the fighter pilot specialization to women candidates in 2015. She received her fighter certification on August 23, 2018, and was assigned to 305th Tactical Fighter Squadron of the Japan Air Self-Defense Force's 5th Air Wing, headquartered at Nyutabaru Air Base, where she will fly the Mitsubishi F-15J. 

Japan has had female military aviators since Kazue Kashiji in 1997; Matsushima is the first to pilot a fighter type aircraft.

References

1991 births
Living people
Japan Air Self-Defense Force personnel
Women aviators
Women military aviators
Japanese women aviators
National Defense Academy of Japan alumni
Japanese female military personnel